Guerrino "Gerry" Moro (born 17 April 1943) is a Canadian athlete. He competed in the decathlon at the 1964 Summer Olympics and the 1972 Summer Olympics. In 1966, he competed in the men's decathlon at the 1966 British Empire and Commonwealth Games held in Kingston, Jamaica.

References

1943 births
Living people
Athletes (track and field) at the 1964 Summer Olympics
Athletes (track and field) at the 1972 Summer Olympics
Canadian male pole vaulters
Canadian decathletes
Olympic track and field athletes of Canada
Place of birth missing (living people)
Athletes (track and field) at the 1962 British Empire and Commonwealth Games
Athletes (track and field) at the 1966 British Empire and Commonwealth Games
Commonwealth Games medallists in athletics
Commonwealth Games bronze medallists for Canada
20th-century Canadian people
21st-century Canadian people
Medallists at the 1966 British Empire and Commonwealth Games